The Lackawaxen River is a  tributary of the Delaware River in northeastern Pennsylvania in the United States.

Its source is in the borough of Prompton in western Wayne County, at the confluence of the West Branch and Van Auken Creek. It flows past Honesdale and Hawley, where it is joined from the southwest by Wallenpaupack Creek. Water discharged from the Lake Wallenpaupack hydroelectric facility enters the river downstream from Hawley. The river continues east and joins the Delaware at Lackawaxen. East of Honesdale, it was deepened as part of the Delaware and Hudson Canal project.

The river is a popular destination for canoeing and recreational fly fishing for trout. It was reportedly where the American author Zane Grey first learned to fly fish.

Lackawaxen is Lenape for "swift waters".

West Branch Lackawaxen River
After a second confluence, with Johnson Creek, it flows southeast through Prompton Lake reservoir, to a third confluence, with Van Auken Creek, to form the main stem.

See also
List of Pennsylvania rivers

References

External links
Lackawaxen River Conservancy
Pike County Conservation: Lackawaxen watershed
Lackawaxen Aqueduct
U.S. Geological Survey: PA stream gaging stations

Tributaries of the Delaware River
Rivers of Pennsylvania
Rivers of Wayne County, Pennsylvania
Rivers of Pike County, Pennsylvania